The 2015 Real Salt Lake season is the team's 11th year of existence and their eleventh consecutive season in Major League Soccer, the top division of the American soccer pyramid. In a largely rebuilding season, Salt Lake failed to qualify for the playoffs for the first time since 2007.

Background

Competitions

Preseason

Desert Diamond Cup

MLS regular season

Standings

Western Conference Table

Overall table

Results summary

Match results

U.S. Open Cup 

Real Salt Lake will enter the 2015 U.S. Open Cup with the rest of Major League Soccer in the fourth round.

CONCACAF Champions League 

Real Salt Lake will enter the 2015–16 CONCACAF Champions League in the initial group stage with all other competitors

Club

Roster
As of April 2015. Age calculated as of the start of the 2015 season.

References

2015 Major League Soccer season
2015
2015 in sports in Utah
American soccer clubs 2015 season